John Anderson Hartley (27 August 1844 – 15 September 1896) was an Australian educator and Vice Chancellor of the University of Adelaide from 1893 to 1896.

Hartley was the son of the Rev. John Hartley, governor of the Wesleyan College, Handsworth, Birmingham, and was born in Yorkshire, England. He was educated at the Woodhouse Grove School, near Bradford, (1853–1860), and University College, London, where he graduated B.A. in 1868 and B.Sc. in 1870. He taught for a time at his old school Woodhouse Grove, and at the Methodist College Belfast where he was second master. Hartley married Elizabeth Annie Green  sister-in-law of the headmaster, Rev. Robert Crooke.

In 1871 Hartley became head master of Prince Alfred College, Adelaide, South Australia, then a comparatively new school with about 100 pupils. In three years the number was raised to 150 and Hartley was getting on so well with the staff and the boys that it appeared as though the college had found its ideal principal. However, in 1875 Hartley resigned to become president of the newly appointed council of education.

Some four years later the council was abolished, and Hartley was appointed inspector-general of schools and permanent head of the South Australian Education Department. He immediately began remodelling the whole system. He met with opposition from a section of the press and from teachers who objected to his methods, and Hartley was more pleased than otherwise when in August 1881 a select committee was appointed to go into the questions at issue. In November of that year the inquiry was taken over by a Royal Commission. Much evidence was taken and the whole question of primary education was exhaustively examined. The report of the commission completely exonerated Hartley and spoke in the highest terms of his methods. Henceforth he was completely trusted by successive ministers, the public, and his teaching staff. It was said of him in later years that his few opponents were people who had never met him and had little real knowledge of his methods. His first problem had been to build up a sound system of primary education, but as the years went by his efforts were given to relating this in the best possible way to secondary education and the university.

Hartley devised the system of junior, senior, and advanced public examinations, and, as a member of the council of the University of Adelaide from its beginning in 1874, he gave much time to committee work and the framing of the curriculum for degrees. He was appointed vice-chancellor in 1893 and held the position until his death. He found time to take an interest in the public service association of which he was president several times.  He was the prime mover in organizing the public teachers' provident fund, and he was also associated with the public service provident fund. In connexion with his own department he edited the Education Gazette and was responsible for a paper for juveniles, The Children's Hour.

He died on 15 September 1896 as the result of an accident while riding a bicycle. His funeral procession was led by six headmasters and 3,000 children.

The death of Hartley at the comparatively early age of 52 was felt in South Australia to be a public calamity. His great capacity for work, his insistence on discipline tempered by kindness, his consideration for others, his scholarly attainments, and his administrative capacity, made him a great director of education. The education system of South Australia, entirely remodelled in his time, was his monument. It was said that he had brought its administration to such perfection that the post of minister of education became almost a sinecure.

In private life Hartley was fond of gardening, poetry and art. The Hartley studentship at the University of Adelaide was founded in his memory.

References

G. E. Saunders, 'Hartley, John Anderson (1844 - 1896)', Australian Dictionary of Biography, Volume 4, MUP, 1972, pp 356–357.

Specific

1844 births
1896 deaths
Australian headmasters
Australian people of English descent
Cycling road incident deaths
People educated at Woodhouse Grove School
Road incident deaths in South Australia
Vice-Chancellors of the University of Adelaide